Mother Mushroom (born 1979 in Khánh Hòa, Vietnam) is the pen name of the Vietnamese blogger and dissident, Nguyễn Ngọc Như Quỳnh. Mushroom or Nấm in Vietnamese is the name of her daughter. She first used the pen name in her popular blog ''Mẹ Nấm'.

After having her first child, nicknamed "Nấm" (mushroom), Nguyễn Ngọc Như Quỳnh joined several parenting fora using Mẹ Nấm (Mother Mushroom) as her pen name, primarily to exchange parenting tips with others. Later on, her blogs developed to cover social issues. She started blogging in 2006 after a visit to a hospital where she witnessed many poor, desperate patients waiting to be seen but ignored as they did not have enough money to bribe hospital officials.

Quỳnh says her motive for blogging is very simple: "I don't want my children to struggle and have to do what I'm doing right now."

Blogging and arrests
Quỳnh has been blogging under the pseudonym of Mẹ Nấm (Mother Mushroom) and has openly criticised the Vietnamese government over its human rights violations and corruption. She began blogging in early 2006 when she visited a hospital and witnessed many poor people in the hot sun desperately waiting for treatment, but ignored because they lacked money to bribe hospital officials.

Quynh was first arrested in 2009 for blogging about government land confiscations related to a Chinese-backed bauxite mine and for printing T-shirts opposing the bauxite project. She was released nine days later, after she promised to close the blog.

2016 arrest
On 10 October 2016, Mother Mushroom was arrested while trying to visit an imprisoned political activist. The Office of the United Nations High Commissioner for Human Rights reported that she was arrested in Khanh Hoa and charged with crimes under Article 88 of Vietnam's Penal Code, which prohibits "conducting propaganda against the Socialist Republic of Viet Nam."

Reaction
The United States, the European Union and UN High Commissioner for Human Rights demanded Mother Mushroom's release and stated that the government's arrest of her violated international human rights norms, as well as Vietnam's domestic laws on human rights. Ted Osius, the U.S. Ambassador to Vietnam said he was "deeply concerned" about the Vietnamese government's detention of activists and stated: "This trend threatens to overshadow Vietnam's progress on human rights."

Bärbel Kofler, the Human Rights Commissioner for the German Federal Government, issued a statement on 11 October on the arrest: "... this would be another serious violation of the human rights principles and international rules that Viet Nam has made a commitment to uphold."

Zeid Ra'ad Al Hussein, the United Nations High Commissioner for Human Rights, said in a news release: "Article 88 effectively makes it a crime for any Vietnamese citizen to enjoy the fundamental freedom to express an opinion, to discuss or to question the Government and its policies. The overly broad, ill-defined scope of this law makes it all too easy to quash any kind of dissenting views and to arbitrarily detain individuals who dare to criticize Government policies."

On 29 June 2017, she was sentenced to 10 years of jail by a court in Khánh Hòa Province after being found guilty of publishing propaganda against the state.

On 17 October 2018, she was released from prison and exiled. She and her family have been granted political asylum in the United States.

Awards
 Human Rights Watch, Hellman/Hammett grant program recipient (2010)
 Civil Rights Defenders, Defender of the Year (2015) Speak with RFA's Vietnamese Service after she won the award, she said: "I still wish I did not have to receive such awards, because I live in an authoritarian country and I got the awards for fighting efforts."

References 

1979 births
No-U Movement
Living people
Prisoners and detainees of Vietnam
Vietnamese bloggers
Vietnamese democracy activists
Vietnamese women activists
Vietnamese dissidents
Vietnamese Roman Catholics
People from Khánh Hòa Province
21st-century Vietnamese writers
21st-century Vietnamese women writers
Pseudonymous women writers
Vietnamese women bloggers
Vietnamese exiles
Recipients of the International Women of Courage Award
21st-century pseudonymous writers